Margarete Dorothea Hannsmann (née Wurster; February 10, 1921, in Heidenheim an der Brenz – March 29, 2007, in Stuttgart) was a German writer, best remembered for her numerous volumes of poetry, prose, travelogues, and radio plays. She was awarded the Schubart-Literaturpreis on 1976, the Johann-Friedrich-von-Cotta-Literatur- und Übersetzerpreis der Landeshauptstadt Stuttgart in 1980, and the Order of Merit of the Federal Republic of Germany in 1982. She also wrote under the pseudonym Sancho Pansa.

References 

1921 births
2007 deaths
Recipients of the Cross of the Order of Merit of the Federal Republic of Germany
German writers